Angelena: Change The World is a 2017 Australian autobiographical documentary film based on the Australian-born model/actress Angelena Bonet, evolving into a singer-songwriter, journalist/producer, and global women's rights activist. The entire film was produced and starred by herself.

Premise

Journey of Angelena Bonet as a child, who first appeared on television at the age of four in her hometown of Sydney, whose career grew to be an Australian supermodel, singer-songwriter and global women's rights activist, in particular violence against women.

Production

Angelena Bonet self-funded the whole production (Crystal Heart Productions) and worked under a micro-budget. The film features raw footage of her whole life to the present day and was shot on location in Australia, Philippines, Italy, Canada and the US. She also co-wrote the music score with her late fiancé, Erick Deeby.

Activism

Bonet is donating 10% of her soundtrack album sales to her non-profit organization Crystal Heart Foundation to support female survivors of sexual violence and those suffering from Post Traumatic Stress Disorder.

Soundtrack
Score & all tracks composed by Angelena Bonet & Erick Deeby. All tracks performed by Angelena Bonet.
"Tragic Fairytale" (Original Song at IndieFEST Film Awards: Won)
"Revolution"
"Downtown"
"Live Forever"
"Change The World"
"On My Way"
"Crystalize"

Awards and nominations

|-
| rowspan="4"| 2017
|Angelena: Change The World
| 
Impact DOCS Awards – Award of Recognition
| 
|-

|-
| rowspan="5"| 2018
|Angelena: Change The World
| 
World Music & Independent Film Festival – Best Documentary Feature
World Music & Independent Film Festival – Best Director
World Music & Independent Film Festival – Best Female Filmmaker
| 
|-

References

External links
 
 
 

2017 films
Australian documentary films
2017 documentary films
2010s English-language films